Frederick W. Prender (1931 – April 8, 1975) was a minor league baseball player and American football coach. He served as the head football coach at Juniata College from 1963 to 1968 and Bucknell University from 1969 to 1974, compiling a career college football coach record of 53–50–3. A college football]player at West Chester University of Pennsylvania, Prender was drafted by the Pittsburgh Steelers in 1954.

Head coaching record

Football

References

External links
 

1931 births
1975 deaths
American football running backs
Bucknell Bison football coaches
Juniata Eagles football coaches
Thetford Mines Miners players
West Chester Golden Rams football players